Mallophora orcina, the southern bee killer, is a species of robber flies in the family Asilidae.

References

External links

 

Asilidae
Articles created by Qbugbot
Insects described in 1828